Barry Cordjohn (born 5 September 1942) is an English former professional footballer who played in the Football League as a defender.

Career
Coedjohn came through the youth ranks at Charlton Athletic before graduating to the first team. After a short spell with Aldershot, he represented Portsmouth and Wimbledon, where he made 91 senior appearances over 3 seasons, before joining Margate. At Margate, he made a single senior appearance in the Kent Floodlit Cup. His career ended after he sustained an injury during a reserve game and was later diagnosed with tetanus.

References

1942 births
Living people
Footballers from Oxford
English footballers
Association football defenders
Charlton Athletic F.C. players
Aldershot F.C. players
Portsmouth F.C. players
Wimbledon F.C. players
Margate F.C. players
English Football League players